Aleksandra Vasiljević (born 10 August 1986) is a Bosnia and Herzegovina biathlete. She competed in two events at the 2006 Winter Olympics.

Biathlon results
All results are sourced from the International Biathlon Union.

Olympic Games

World Championships

References

1986 births
Living people
Biathletes at the 2006 Winter Olympics
Bosnia and Herzegovina female biathletes
Olympic biathletes of Bosnia and Herzegovina
Place of birth missing (living people)
Serbs of Bosnia and Herzegovina